Bueng Phra is a tambon (subdistrict) of Mueang Phitsanulok District, in Phitsanulok Province, Thailand. In 2020 it had a total population of 19,417 people.

History
The subdistrict was created effective September 1, 1979 by splitting off 8 administrative villages from Wat Chan, Wat Phrik, Aranyik.

Geography
Bueng Phra lies in the Nan Basin, which is part of the Chao Phraya Watershed.

Administration

Central administration
The tambon is subdivided into 10 administrative villages (muban).

Local administration
The whole area of the subdistrict is covered by the subdistrict administrative organization (SAO) Bueng Phra (องค์การบริหารส่วนตำบลบึงพระ).

Temples
Wat Bueng Phra (วัดบึงพระ) in Ban Bueng Phra
วัดพิกุลวนาราม in Ban Saphan
วัดสุธาวนาราม in Ban Pak Lat
Wat Pikun Thong (วัดพิกุลทอง) in Ban Dong Phikun
Wat Nong Phai Lom (วัดหนองไผ่ล้อม) in Ban Nong Phai Lom
วัดราษฎร์ศรัทธาราม in Ban Khlong Chan
วัดสันติวัน in Ban Bueng Phra

References

External links
Thaitambon.com on Bueng Phra

Tambon of Phitsanulok province
Populated places in Phitsanulok province